Rainbow Butterfly Unicorn Kitty, officially shortened to RBUK, is an animated children's television series created by Rich Magallanes. The series is produced by American toy company Funrise and Canadian studio Bardel Entertainment.

The series stars Felicity, a spirited magical kitty who is also part rainbow, butterfly, and unicorn, as she goes on adventures with her friends in the mashup city of Mythlandia. In the United States, Nickelodeon acquired broadcast rights to the first season from Funrise Toys.

Plot 
Rainbow Butterfly Unicorn Kitty follows the mythical adventures of Felicity, a magical cat that is part rainbow, part butterfly, and part unicorn. She has transformative powers that allow her to choose between Rainbow Power, Butterfly Power, Unicorn Power, and following the events of Purrfect Party, Kitty Power. Her friends; Miguel, a down-to-earth Anubis chihuahua, Athena, a book-smart owl, and Yana the ditzy yeti, accompany Felicity on their various adventures in the city of Mythlandia, a place full of fairy tale creatures, wizards, giants, dragons, and much more, while also occasionally hanging out together at Mythic Malts, a restaurant owned by Moona that sells delicious malts, to cool down.

Each episode has been stated to "explore female empowerment and non-conformity" as Felicity transforms into different forms using her magical abilities. The series is also a celebration of individuality and self-confidence.

Characters

Main 
 Felicity (voiced by Allegra Clark) is a sassy, fearless magical cat who is part rainbow, butterfly, and unicorn. She possesses transformative powers that allow her to lasso items in the form of a rainbow, produce thunderous claps from her butterfly wings, fire lasers from her unicorn horn, and her kitten paws can shoot glow sticks and uses her cuteness.
 Miguel (voiced by Arturo Sandoval) is a blue down-to-earth, active and energetic Anubis chihuahua, who is Felicity's best friend. King Nacho (Billy Bongo) is his Anubis dog ancestor.
 Athena (voiced by Katie Leigh) is a book-smart owl and one of Felicity's friends. She speaks in a very monotone voice.
 Yana (voiced by Laila Berzins) is a ditzy Yeti and is also one of Felicity's friends.

Recurring
 The Sun (played by Michael Sorich) is a sentient sun with a live-action human face. He also has skinny arms and is able to talk. Being the Sun, he oversees the many adventures of the main cast and occasionally commentates, or silently reacts to them. As shown in "The Sand Crab Man", he also turns into the Moon at night.
 Rudy (voiced by Chase Mitchell) is a snarky rat that pretends to be a rabbit. He often causes trouble for Felicity and friends.
 Timmy (voiced by Rich Magallanes) is a little Kraken who often causes trouble.
 Mayor Snowball (voiced by Dorothy Elias-Fahn) is the mayor of Catlantic City. Her former rival is Mayor Wags (Kyle Hebert).
 The Sand Crab Man (voiced by Doug Stone) helps the other citizens of Mythlandia with falling asleep.
 Moona (voiced by Sara Cravens) is a cow and the owner of Mythic Malts. She dates Oscar Go, a slow French snail.
 Chippy (voiced by Cristina Vee) is a chipmunk-like creature.
 Andy (voiced by Kyle Hebert) is a dragon.
 Hank is a hippo that is part Bumblebee, Magnetic and Karaoke.

Production 
Rainbow Butterfly Unicorn Kitty is produced by Funrise, who took over production of the series for Saban Brands after its closure due to the sale of the majority of its entertainment properties to Hasbro. The series is animated by Bardel Entertainment, and it features photo-real elements. The series is targeted towards kids 6 to 11.

The first season has a total of 52 11-minute episodes. For broadcast, each episode is paired with another to fill a 22-minute slot, which makes for a total of 26 half-hours. The final episode of the season however, is a two-part holiday special.

Episodes

Broadcast 
Rainbow Butterfly Unicorn Kitty was originally planned to be launched in Fall 2018, but was postponed to 2019. In the United States, the series had a sneak peek premiere on the main Nickelodeon network on January 27, 2019, before it had its season premiere on Nicktoons a day after. Alongside the premiere, the same sneak peek episode was made available on the Nick App and Nick On Demand on January 18. The sneak peek was successful enough to warrant the show remaining on Nickelodeon's schedule whilst also airing on Nicktoons. Episode premieres continued on the main network on February 10 with the episodes "The Green-Eyed Monster" and "Rainbow Butterfly Unicorn Cupid". During this temporary switch from Nicktoons to Nickelodeon, only the acronym for the show, RBUK, is used which differed from how the show was mentioned and displayed on promos, advertisements, most TV guides, and the theme song which was cut from all broadcasts. The series returned to Nicktoons on June 21, 2019, starting with the episode "The Trouble with Travis", and premiering all segments on separate days. The series was added to Paramount+ on September 22, 2021.

Jetpack Distribution announced that it acquired international distribution rights in Canada, Latin America, Europe (excluding Italy and Russia), Australia, Asia, Africa, and the Middle East.  The series premiered on some of Nickelodeon's international channels and branded blocks following the U.S. launch later in 2019. In Canada, the series debuted on Family Channel on September 2, 2019. The series premiered January 1, 2020 on eToonz in South Africa.

Reception
Emily Ashby of Common Sense Media gave the series 2 out of 5 stars; saying that, “Felicity's unique nature makes her a decent example of embracing uniqueness in yourself and in others, but the show's frantic pace and distracting visuals tend to overshadow this positive quality.”

Merchandise
The associated toy line for the series by Funrise Toys is planned to cover many categories such as figurines, playsets, bobble heads, plush and dress-up. In February 2019, there was a preview of new toys from Funrise at the New York Toy Fair. The toys were released at Walmart on July 1, 2019.

Notes

References

External links 
 
  on Funrise
  on Family

2010s American animated television series
2019 American television series debuts
2019 American television series endings
2010s Canadian animated television series
2019 Canadian television series debuts
2019 Canadian television series endings
American children's animated adventure television series
American children's animated comedy television series
American children's animated fantasy television series
American children's animated science fantasy television series
American flash animated television series
Anime-influenced Western animated television series
Canadian children's animated adventure television series
Canadian children's animated comedy television series
Canadian children's animated fantasy television series
Canadian children's animated science fantasy television series
Canadian flash animated television series
Nickelodeon original programming
Television shows based on toys
English-language television shows
Animated television series about cats
Animated television series about dogs
Fictional shapeshifters
Yeti in fiction